The commune of Matongo is a commune of Kayanza Province in northern Burundi. The capital lies at Bandaga.

References

Communes of Burundi
Kayanza Province